Arthur Noble Sager (October 2, 1871 – October 17, 1949) was an American lawyer and college football coach. He served as the head football coach at DePauw University in Greencastle, Indiana from 1892 to 1893, where he was a law student.

Sager moved to St. Louis, Missouri in 1896 to become a lawyer. There, he also served as the head football coach at Washington University in St. Louis in 1899.

References

External links
 

1871 births
1949 deaths
DePauw Tigers football coaches
Washington University Bears football coaches
Missouri lawyers
DePauw University alumni
Sportspeople from Kenosha, Wisconsin
Coaches of American football from Wisconsin